Gravindex is an agglutination inhibition test performed on a urine sample to detect pregnancy. It is based on double antigen antibody reaction. The test detects the prevention of agglutination of HCG-coated latex particles by HCG present in the urine of pregnant women.

Procedure and results 
Kits commercially available contain two reagents; one is a suspension of HCG-coated latex particles, and the other is a solution of HCG antibodies. One drop of the urine is mixed with one drop of antibody solution for one minute on a black glass slide. One drop of the HCG-coated latex particles are added to the slide and left for one minute.

If the level of HCG is too low, the antibodies will remain to agglutinate the HCG-coated latex particles. If agglutination occurs, the subject is not pregnant.
If the level of HCG is high, the HCG will bind to the antibodies, and thus no agglutination with the HCG-coated latex particles occurs. If no agglutination occurs, the subject is pregnant.
Advantages : It gives result in 5 to 30 minutes 
Disadvantages : Proteinuria May give false positive results

Best sample of urine for gravindex test is "Early morning first urine."

References

Tests for pregnancy